Now Hare This is a 1958 Warner Bros. Looney Tunes cartoon directed by Robert McKimson and written by Tedd Pierce. The short was released on May 31, 1958, and stars Bugs Bunny.

Plot 
The story involves Bugs Bunny eluding the Big Bad Wolf and his nephew. After the elder wolf is unable to catch Bugs through traditional means, he gets inspiration from his nephew, who gives him ideas for catching Bugs based on nursery rhymes.

First, the wolves lure Bugs into playing Little Red Riding Hood so the Big Bad Wolf, who is playing Grandma, can trap Bugs. But Bugs escapes by putting hot coals from a fireplace into the bed that Big Bad is in.

Next, Bugs plays Goldilocks in The Story of the Three Bears. Big Bad thinks that he has Bugs trapped again, and tries to get revenge by using hot coals on the bed that Bugs is supposed to be in. But instead Big Bad lights a dynamite stick attached to fake rabbit ears and the dynamite explodes in his face.

Bugs then proceeds to explain to the exasperated Big Bad how he can have a rabbit for dinner, and the cartoon concludes with Big Bad and his nephew sharing dinner with Bugs, who says, "If you can't eat 'em, join 'em", as the cartoon fades out.

References to popular culture

Both the Big Bad Wolf and Bugs say "hoo, hoo, hooo!", a catch phrase which had been made popular by the character Mr. Kitzel as played by Artie Auerbach on The Jack Benny Show.

References

External links

 

1958 films
1958 animated films
1958 short films
1958 comedy films
Looney Tunes shorts
Warner Bros. Cartoons animated short films
Films directed by Robert McKimson
Films based on The Three Little Pigs
Films based on Goldilocks and the Three Bears
American parody films
Fairy tale parody films
Animated films about wolves
Films based on Little Red Riding Hood
Films scored by Milt Franklyn
Bugs Bunny films
Big Bad Wolf
1950s Warner Bros. animated short films
1950s English-language films